A Tiempo de Rock (English: Time to Rock) is the second album of the band Sombrero Verde (now Maná).

Track list

 "No Me Mires Así" was used by in the Mexican rock band Maná, in their second album Falta Amor. It was the eleventh song on the track listing and extended.

Personnel
 Fher Olvera – main vocals, acoustic guitar and electric guitar
 Gustavo Orozco – electric guitar
 Juan Diego Calleros – bass
 Ulises Calleros – electric guitar, choir
 Abraham Calleros – drums, percussion

Additional personnel
 Adolfo Diaz – saxophone
 Raúl Garduño – keyboards
 Memo Espinoza and José Villar – trumpets

1983 albums